The Democratic Party of Bosniaks, formerly Democratic Reform Party of Muslims is a left-wing Bosniak minority party in Serbia and Kosovo.

The party entered Serbian parliament in the 1990 and 1992 elections.

References

Bosniak political parties
Political parties established in 1990
Political parties of minorities in Serbia
Political parties of minorities in Kosovo